Bernard J. Barkouskie (June 5, 1928 – May 10, 1998) was an American football player.  He played college football for the Pittsburgh Panthers football team at the guard position from 1947 to 1949.  He was selected by Collier's Weekly, the International News Service, and the Newspaper Enterprise Association as a first-team player on the 1949 College Football All-America Team. After graduating from Pitt in 1950, Barkouskie trained with the Pittsburgh Steelers and appeared in an exhibition game, but he opted to join the United States Navy in August 1950 instead of pursuing a career in professional football. He served as a pilot in the Korean War and later worked for Englehard Corp. from 1967 to 1993.  He died in Bethlehem, Pennsylvania in 1998.

References 

1928 births
1998 deaths
Pittsburgh Panthers football players
American football guards
Players of American football from Pennsylvania
People from Northumberland County, Pennsylvania
United States Navy personnel of the Korean War
United States Naval Aviators
Military personnel from Pennsylvania